Maha Shaktishaali  is a 1994 Bollywood action drama film directed by K. Pappu and produced by Ratan Mohan. The film was released under the banner of R. M. Art Productions on 15 April 1994.

Plot
This is the story on an honest truck driver Jaswant. His best friend turns out an underworld kingpin. He fights against his old friend and other criminals for justice.

Cast
 Dharmendra as Jaswant " Jassi" Singh 
 Amrish Puri as Dhanna " DJ" Singh
 Anupam Kher as Inspector Prakash Varma
 Ayesha Jhulka as Poonam
 Avinash Wadhawan
 Sonu Walia
 Alok Nath
 Tej Sapru
 Gulshan Grover

Soundtrack

References

External links
 

1994 films
1990s Hindi-language films
Films directed by K. Pappu
Films scored by Anand–Milind
Indian action drama films